Tanvi Bhatia is an Indian television actress who started her career as a child artist and later went on to play a lead role in Gunaho ke devtaa.

Television
 Mitwa Phool Kamal Ke as Bela
 Gunahon Ka Devta as Arpita Avdhesh Singh Thakur/Pihu Avdhesh Singh Thakur 
 Kehta Hai Dil as Kiran(Few episodes)
 Dharamveer as Rajkumari Sia

References

External links

Living people
Indian television actresses
Year of birth missing (living people)